Stordahl is a surname. Notable people with the surname include:

Axel Stordahl (1913–1963), American arranger
Erling Stordahl (1923–1994), Norwegian farmer and singer
Jostein Stordahl (born 1966), Norwegian disabled sportsperson
Larry Stordahl (born 1942), American ice hockey player
Ronald Stordahl, American businessman

See also
Olaf Stordahl Barn